Senthamangalam is a state assembly constituency in Tamil Nadu, India, that was formed after constituency delimitations in 2007. Its State Assembly Constituency number is 93. The seat is reserved for candidates from the Scheduled Tribes and comprises portions of the Rasipuram and Namakkal taluks. It is a part of the wider Namakkal constituency for national elections to the Parliament of India. It is one of the 234 State Legislative Assembly Constituencies in Tamil Nadu in India.

Prior to the 2007 demilitarisation exercise, the local constituency was called Sendamangalam. That, too, was reserved for candidates from the Scheduled Tribes.

Madras State

Tamil Nadu

Election results

2021

2016

2011

2006

2001

1996

1991

1989

1984

1980

1977

1971

1967

1962

1957

References 

Assembly constituencies of Tamil Nadu
Namakkal district